The Falconer is a bronze sculpture in Central Park, New York City by English sculptor George Blackall Simonds. It depicts a man in a theatrical version of Elizabethan dress standing on a high granite pedestal, releasing a hunting falcon.

The Falconer, cast in 1871 in Florence, was erected in 1875 on a prominent rock overlooking the confluence of Terrace Drive and another carriage drive near the West 72nd Street drive entrance. The growth of surrounding trees has partly obscured the site. The sculpture has a history of being vandalized. The original falcon was stolen, and in the 1960s the  New York City Parks Department commissioned their employee and sculptor, Joel Rudnick, to mold a new falcon which now sits on The Falconer's arm. This new falcon is substantially different from the original falcon. The arm itself was also re-fashioned by Parks' employee Domenico Facci.

References

External links
 NYC Parks Description of The Falconer
 Daytonian in Manhattan blog

1871 sculptures
Sculptures by George Blackall Simonds
Sculptures of birds in the United States
Bronze sculptures in Central Park
Sculptures in Central Park
Statues in New York City
Sculptures of men in New York City
Vandalized works of art in New York City
1875 establishments in New York (state)